Channarayapatna Taluk is one of the eight taluks of Hassan District, Karnataka, India. Channarayapatna town, being the taluka headquarters, lies on the Mangalore - Bangalore National highway 75 in Karnataka, India. Its popularity can be attributed to historical, religious, Coconut farming, Sugar and also in the field of Literature, Culture, Religion etc. Now it is growing predominantly towards improvements in this modern era. Taluk Office, Channarayapatna is located off the Bangalore-Mangalore highway in Channarayapatna town. The office is housed in a royal & majestic Mini Vidhana Soudha. In addition to the Taluka office, it also houses Sub-Registrar office, Sub-Treasury office & Labour Inspector offices. The Taluk Office is headed by Tahsildar who is of KAS cadre. They include Shirastedars, Deputy Tahsildars, Revenue Inspectors, FDAs, SDAs & Village Accountants. Tahsildar also heads survey section which has survey supervisors, surveyors, Band Jawans, Licensed Surveyors besides managing food & civil supplies section which includes Food Shirastedar, Food Inspectors. Tahsildar has to manage muzrai section to take care of muzrai temples. In addition to conventional revenue duties Tahsildar has to perform magisterial functions as provided in CrPC. Besides revenue and magisterial duty tahsildar has to many other functions related to election, disaster management, SC/ST and Backward classes, women, children welfare etc. Overall he will be responsible for peace and tranquility of the taluk. It has an average elevation of 827 metres (2716 ft). There are 40 panchayat villages in Channarayapatna Taluk, for 407 villages.

Economy 
Agriculture is the major economic activity. Sugarcane & Coconut are the leading commercial crops, while food crops include Ragi, Potato, Sunflower, and Paddy.  The taluk also has mineral reserves, such as chromite.

Demographics
As of 2011 India census, Channarayapatna has a population of  279,798. Males constitute 51% of the population and females 49%. Channarayapatna has an average literacy rate of 73%, higher than the national average of 59.5%; with male literacy of 78% and female literacy of 68%. 11% of the population is under 6 years of age.

Gallery

People from Channarayapatna 
 H. C. Srikantaiah, Former Minister and Member of Parliament
  Dr. N B Nanjappa, Former Member of legislative Assembly
 S. L. Bhyrappa, novelist and professor
 Nanditha, playback singer
 C. N. Manjunath, cardiologist
 Nagaraj Kote, actor in Kannada Movies

References

External links
 

Taluks of Karnataka
Hassan district